Brighton Le Sands (formerly Brighton-le-Sands and also known simply as Brighton or Brighton Beach), is a suburb in southern Sydney, in the state of New South Wales, Australia. Brighton Le Sands is located 13 kilometres south of the Sydney central business district, on the western shore of Botany Bay. Brighton Le Sands is in the local government area of the Bayside Council and is part of the St George area.

Lady Robinsons Beach and Cook Park run along the eastern border of Brighton Le Sands, on Botany Bay. The beach is also commonly referred to as Brighton Beach and is known for its off-white sand. Brighton Le Sands features a mixture of low density houses, medium density flats, high rise apartments, retail, cafés and restaurants. The Grand Parade runs along the foreshore and intersects with Bay Street, at the commercial centre. The higher density developments are located along these roads.

History

The area between the Cooks River and Georges River was originally known as Seven Mile Beach. It was changed to Lady Robinsons Beach in 1874 to honour Governor Sir Hercules Robinson's wife. Cook Park, established in about 1882, is a strip of reserve land 30 metres inland from the high water mark of the sea. The park is named after Samuel Cook who advocated it as a public pleasure area. The name Seven Mile Beach was last used in the Sydney Morning Herald on 28 February 1879, whilst the first use of the name Lady Robinson's Beach by the same newspaper was on 1 June 1877.

New Brighton was the name given to his new housing estate by tramway pioneer Thomas Saywell, who had plans to emulate the famous seaside resort Brighton in England. Land acquisitions began in the 1840s but no significant development of Brighton Le Sands occurred until the railway opened to Hurstville, via Rockdale in 1884. In 1885 Thomas Saywell constructed a tramway from Rockdale to Lady Robinsons Beach, along Bay Street. He was given a 30-year lease on the line. Thomas Saywell also financed and built the public swimming baths, a substantial picnic area called the Shady Nook Recreational Park (1898-1918), a race course and the Brighton Hotel, on the current Novotel site. The developments were a huge success. To avoid confusion with the English Brighton, the district became known as Brighton-le-Sands. From 1900, the tramway was electrified. The tramway passed into government ownership in 1914. The line was closed in September 1949, as the Sydney tramway system was slowly wound down. A bus route replaced the tram route.

Brighton Baths attracted a large number of Sydney's weekend holidaymakers. The racecourse operated from about 1897 to 1911. The baths were also popular with punters who could cool off after a stressful day at the races.

Brighton Hotel was stripped of its licence in 1892 due to violence and reckless behaviour that found expression in the hotel and its surrounding area. The depression of the 1890s meant that many unemployed workers lived in the district and frequented the hotel, leading to a crisis for the area. The area several kilometres north of the hotel was used during the depression as one of many shanty sites that spread across Sydney, especially in the 1930s. Thomas Saywell offered the use of the hotel to The Scots College. Albert Aspinall, brother of the first Principal, Arthur Ashworth Aspinall, transformed the ground floor of the building to classrooms and the hotel rooms into the dormitory. In 1895 the principal of the college, Arthur Aspinall, decided to transfer The Scots College to Bellevue Hill. This was to avoid both the proximity of the local racecourse and the distraction the nearby beach was having on his students.

By 1900 there were pleasure grounds south of Bay Street, as well as a pony racetrack. Development of the land south of Bay Street for housing began before World War I [Post Office Directories]. Extensive development of the northern area of the suburb occurred after World War I, in the late 1920s and again in the 1950s. For the first 20 years of the 20th century, a small boat ran a ferry service around Botany Bay, with an important stop at Brighton Le Sands. In 1966 a freak storm hit the coastline, destroying the baths and much of the beach. The expansion of Sydney Airport and Port Botany involved dredging sand from the bay and disrupted sedimentary sand flows. This caused serious damage to the area. Beach restoration projects have attempted to restore the damage done to the coastline in recent years.

Commercial area

The main shopping precinct is located along Bay Street and extends to the foreshore on The Grand Parade and down a short length of Moate Avenue. The landmark Novotel Hotel Brighton Beach, located on north-western corner of the intersection of Bay Street and The Grand Parade, also contains a significant amount of commercial and retail space. Many cafés and restaurants are located along The Grand Parade and Bay Street, covering many types of cuisine: Australian, Greek, French, European, Italian, Thai and Japanese. Take-away food shops are also abundant, particularly for seafood, chicken, cakes and gelato. Shops and services include supermarket, banks, post office, clothing, jewellery, hair dressers, doctors and fishing supplies.

The appearance of a Coles supermarket in Moate Avenue in the late 1990s decimated some of the smaller specialty shops. It also competed with the existing Flemings supermarket for two years before the latter closed and in 2005 the local family-run fruit store also folded. The supermarket is part of a high-rise residential development and the incorporation of a car park was a requirement for Coles to be allowed to trade from this site. Developments to the area are planned as part of a multimillion-dollar upgrade called "Destinations Rockdale".

Transport
Brighton Le Sands has very little public transport. There is a two kilometre bus service available to link with Rockdale railway station, which forces a lot of residents to catch a lengthy bus ride to Rockdale station. Transit Systems operates all the routes that pass by Brighton Le Sands. Route 303 runs from Sans Souci to Randwick via Brighton-le-Sands and Mascot. Route 478 runs from Westfield Miranda to Rockdale railway station via Ramsgate and Brighton Le Sands. Route 479 runs from Rockdale Plaza via Rockdale railway station to Kyeemagh and Brighton-Le-Sands.

Historically, starting in 1903, a weekend ferry service connected Brighton-le-Sands, Kurnell, Sans Souci, and La Perouse.

Landmarks

 Lady Robinsons Beach, Brighton Le Sands Baths
 Cook Park, White Oak Reserve, CA Redmond Field Memorial Playing Fields, Tony Baker Reserve, Bicentennial Park East
 Bayside Church (Australian Christian Churches), church plant of Shirelive Church
 St Thomas More Catholic Church, St Andrews Uniting Church, St Marks Anglican Church
 Brighton Le Sands Primary School
 Brighton Le Sands Library (Bayside Library)

Culture

Entertainment
Brighton Le Sands is a popular location for multicultural cuisine and night-time entertainment. The Novotel Hotel has a bar and buffet restaurant. Brighton Le Sands RSL is located opposite in Bay Street. The area has been dubbed 'Little Greece by the Bay' for its many Greek cafés, restaurants and businesses. Restaurants include Mezes, Gecko, Kamari, Eataly le Sands, Café Neptune, Atlantis on the Bay Restaurant, Souvlaki Bar, Botany Bay Seafood, Petar's Seafood, Piccolo's Italian Restaurant, Nakhon Thai, EuroBay, Le Sands Cafe, Bondi Pizza, Hurricanes, Little Sicily and La Rousse French.
There is also a very talented family who are experts in the field of magic and perform on the streets at night.

The Kiosk, Le Sands Pavilion, Hurricanes Grill and Hogs Breath are on the beach side of The Grand Parade, overlooking the sand and the boardwalk.

It was the centre of celebrations after Greece won the Euro 2004 Football (soccer) Cup. Bay Street was also closed at night and a large screen erected during the Athens 2004 Summer Olympics, however this proved less popular and wasn't repeated for future sporting events.

Attractions
Brighton Le Sands is the site of the Bicentennial Monument which stands in Cook Park, on the Botany Bay foreshore. It commemorates the arrival of the First Fleet in Botany Bay in 1788.

The Greek Australian Sports Hall of Fame was established to commemorate the Athens 2004 Summer Olympics. It was originally housed in the old Royal Volunteer Coastal Patrol building on The Grande Parade close to the intersection of Bay Street, but was moved further south, when this building was demolished in 2008. A statue of 1896 Greek gold medallist Spyros Louis also stands nearby in Cook Park.

A shared paved walkway and cycleway runs the length of Cook Park from Kyeemagh to Sandringham (approximately 7 kilometres) and is popular with both walkers, joggers and cyclists especially on weekends. For cyclists it provides access to the Homebush Bay Cycle route (North from Kyeemagh), and the Cronulla to Kurnell cycleway via the Captain Cook Bridge (South), and also forms part of the Sydney Coastal Walk.

Every New Year's Eve, Bayside Council holds a popular family fireworks display over the water at 9pm which attracts tens of thousands of visitors to Brighton Beach.

Notable residents
 Michael Dransfield, poet, grew up in Brighton Le Sands
 June Salter, actress, grew up in Brighton Le Sands and was educated at the local primary school
 Albert Landa, pianist, grew up in Brighton Le Sands and was educated at the local primary school

Population

According to the 2016 census of Population, there were 8,325 residents in Brighton Le Sands. 49.7% of people were born in Australia. The next most common countries of birth were Greece 4.8%, Egypt 2.9%, China 1.9%, New Zealand 1.8% and Italy 1.5%. 42.4% of people spoke only English at home. Other languages spoken at home included Greek 13.8%, Arabic 6.9%, Spanish 4.0%, Italian 2.5% and Macedonian 2.2%. The most common responses for religion were Catholic 24.8%, Eastern Orthodox 20.6% and No Religion 15.0%.

Brighton Le Sands attracts many young and single residents to the suburb with its beach and entertainment lifestyle. It is known for its large Greek-Australian community which is reflected in many of the businesses.

Politics
Brighton Le Sands is in Ward 5 of the local government area of the City of Rockdale, the federal government division of Barton and state government Electoral district of Rockdale. The local government area City of Rockdale has merged with City of Botany Bay to become "Bayside".

Storm damage
Several times the bridge over Muddy Creek at Bestic Street has flooded to the extent of making it impassable, or even washing the bridge away. Similar problems arose for the bridge over the creek at Bay Street. The floods were particularly bad when water cascading down the hills on the two streets coincided with a high tide in the creek.

Wind storms would deposit sand on The Grand Parade and The Esplanade making them impassable and eroding the sand dunes. Periodically wave damage would erode the beach. The worst damage to the beach occurred on 13 June 1966 (Sydney Morning Herald, 15 June 1966).

Brighton Le Sands Primary School
The initial school building, opened in 1917, was located on the west side of Crawford Road between Kurnell Street and Kings Road. As the population of the suburb increased land was resumed further south on Crawford Road, between Kings Road and O'Neill Street, on which two buildings were constructed in the 1930s: an infants' school to cater for the first three years of schooling and the main upper primary school.

Medical services
The Pacific Private Hospital was located initially on The Esplanade. By 1930 the hospital had relocated to Queens Road. Bigger facilities were built on the south east corner of the intersection of Bay Street and West Botany Street by 1936.

A private convalescent hospital, East Lynn run by Matron Maudie Shaw, opened at 13 Henson Street in the mid-1930s soon after the extension of Henson Street past Reading Road. Matron Shaw's husband was in the Royal Australian Navy. Many of the patients were overseas sailors recuperating from illness or accidents. These sailors were waiting until they were well enough to return home or to rejoin their ships when the ships were next in port. By the 1950s the number of sailors needing convalescence had reduced greatly. The hospital now catered to a wider range of needs within the local population. Matron Shaw retired in the 1960s.

By 1925 a doctors surgery had been opened on the south west corner of the intersection of Crawford Road with Bay Street.

Adelaide Croucher, chiropodist, conducted a business in her own home from the mid-1940s. Initially this was at 17 Francis Avenue, then later from 6 Carinya Avenue. She also visited many clients in their own homes. On Wednesdays she worked at the local hairdressing salon on Bay Street. As people sat under the hairdryer they would have their feet attended to as well.

See also
 History of Brighton Le Sands, New South Wales

References

External links

 Greek Immigration to Australia
 Spokey Blokeys (podcast) - Brighton Le Sands (Episode 7)

Suburbs of Sydney
Botany Bay
Bayside Council